Ed Harris is an American actor and filmmaker. 

Harris has received various accolades including two Golden Globe Awards for Golden Globe Award for Best Supporting Actor – Motion Picture for The Truman Show (1998), and Golden Globe Award for Best Supporting Actor – Series, Miniseries or Television Film for Game Change (2012). He's also received two Screen Actors Guild Awards for Outstanding Performance by a Cast in a Motion Picture and Outstanding Performance by a Male Actor in a Supporting Role for her work on Apollo 13 (1995). 

Harris has received numerous nominations including for four Academy Awards for his work in film for Apollo 13 (1995), The Truman Show (1998), Pollock (2000), and The Hours (2002). For his work on television he was nominated for three Primetime Emmy Awards for Empire Falls (2005), Game Change (2012), and Westworld (2016). For his work on the Broadway stage he received a Tony Award nomination for Precious Son in 1986.

Major associations

Academy Awards

BAFTA Awards

Emmy Awards

Golden Globe Awards

Screen Actors Guild Awards

Tony Awards

Miscellaneous awards

References 

Harris, Ed